Harold G. Stoner (1890–1971) was an American architect who helped define the unique architectural style of San Francisco's west of Twin Peaks district.

Born in Brighton, England, he left for Regina, Canada, to pursue a career in architecture.

After working for the provincial government and completing his advanced education, he obtained an apprenticeship in 1913 with the notable architectural firm led by F. Chapman Clemesha and Frank H. Portnall.

Two years later, Mr. Stoner arrived in the San Francisco bay area and began working for architect Charles McCall in Oakland.  As Mr. Stoner's career progressed, he worked as the chief architect for Lang Brothers Realty. In addition to many beautiful homes west of Twin Peaks and elsewhere in the Bay Area, Mr. Stoner designed the Carolands Gatehouse as well as the 'Tropic Beach' façade of the Sutro Baths and the building that housed Sally Rand's Nude Ranch at the 1939 Golden Gate International Exhibition on Treasure Island.

A veteran of World War I, Stoner was not only associated with some of the Bay Area's most historic events, places, and figures, but was responsible for creating some of its most charming architecture, including four San Francisco Chronicle model homes toured by thousands in the 1920s. His artistic designs graced the covers of Walter Dixon's Home Designer and Garden Beautiful Magazine and were featured on the Golden Gate International Exposition Model Home Tour in 1939. A master of Period Revival designs, including what we now call Storybook style, he excelled at all phases of the Bay Area architectural tradition, from collaboration with noted landscape architect Thomas Church, to creating what renowned architectural historian David Gebhard lauded as “one of the country’s most elegant Art Deco designs.”.

References

1890 births
1971 deaths
20th-century American architects
Architecture in the San Francisco Bay Area
People from the San Francisco Bay Area